Mihály Fekete (31 December 1884 – 16 April 1960) was a Hungarian actor, screenwriter and film director.

Selected filmography
Actor
 The Yellow Foal (1913)
 The Exile (1914)
 Bánk Bán (1914)
 Az aranyember (1936)

Director
 Szibéria (1916)
 Doktorok tragédiája (1918)
 Akik életet cserélnek (1918)
 A kancsuka hazájában (1918)

Bibliography
 Cunningham, John. Hungarian Cinema: From Coffee House to Multiplex. Wallflower Press, 2004.

External links

1884 births
1960 deaths
People from Csongrád
Hungarian film directors
Male screenwriters
Hungarian male writers
Hungarian male film actors
Hungarian male silent film actors
20th-century Hungarian male actors
Hungarian male stage actors
20th-century Hungarian screenwriters